Craven Gap (el. ) is a mountain pass between Peach Knob and Rice Knob, part of the Elk Mountains and Great Craggy Mountains.  NC 694 (Town Mountain Road) connects with the Blue Ridge Parkway at the gap, where it provides direct access to downtown Asheville.  The gap also has trails for hikers and is a popular bicycle rest area.

References

Landforms of Buncombe County, North Carolina
Mountain passes of North Carolina
Transportation in Buncombe County, North Carolina
Blue Ridge Parkway